The Warehouse Project is a series of club nights organised in Greater Manchester, England, since 2006. Unlike most other clubs, it has a limited seasonal approach rather than running all year. Each year's season runs from September through to New Years Day, plus occasional one off dates such as Bank Holiday weekends. This period corresponds with the busiest time of the year and the student calendar.

History

The Warehouse Project was initially started as a joint venture by Sacha Lord and Sam Kandel, who both had previous involvement with the Sankeys nightclub in Manchester. It began operations in the disused Boddingtons Brewery in Strangeways, and then moved into a space under Manchester Piccadilly station, on Store Street, which previously served as an air raid shelter.

On 14 July 2011, The Warehouse Project announced that the 2011 season would be the last ever WHP event at Store Street. This was followed by a later announcement on 22 March 2012 that the 2012 season would be based at the Victoria Warehouse Hotel, to the west of Manchester city centre in Trafford Park, near Old Trafford football stadium. The club remained at this location for the 2013 season as well. In late 2013, rumours started that The Warehouse Project was due to move to the disused Mayfield Depot next to Manchester Piccadilly station from 2014 but a planning application was subsequently withdrawn in September 2013. The Warehouse Project's 2013 season drew to a close at the end of the year, with a final closing party on 1 January 2014 at the Victoria Warehouse Hotel venue.

Despite the announcement made in 2011, the 2014 season returned to Store Street, in a move being described by the organisers as returning to their "spiritual home" for one last year. During this time, the owners of Mayfield Depot decided to redevelop their site rather than retaining it as a cultural venue., so the 2015 season will again be located at the Store Street location.

The 2017 season was announced in July 2017, with 31 shows returning to Store Street once again from September.

Music and artists

Since its foundation the club has played host to numerous internationally acclaimed DJs such as Carl Cox, Sven Väth, Aphex Twin, Richie Hawtin, Deadmau5, Annie Mac, Pete Tong, Armand Van Helden and Erick Morillo, and musicians such as De La Soul, Happy Mondays, Chic, The Prodigy, Disclosure, Basement Jaxx and Foals. In 2007, The Warehouse Project was voted by dance music magazine Mixmag as the best club in the United Kingdom. In 2013 The Warehouse Project was voted by DJ mag as the Best Club Series in the magazines Best of British Awards.

The Warehouse Project is noted for placing international DJs alongside less established artists.

Awards and nominations

DJ Magazine's top 100 Clubs

Fatalities

Two high-profile deaths have occurred at The Warehouse Project, those of Nick Bonnie and Souvik Pal, alongside several reports in the media of near-misses. These incidents resulted in calls from local councillors such as David Acton and Mike Cordingley for the licence to be revoked or reviewed. However, police statements have countered this, with high-ranking officers supporting the club and is management. Sixteen individuals were hospitalised during the first weekend of the 2013 season from taking drugs at the venue, and also include drug dealers at the club who have attempted to avoid arrest by swallowing all their stash.

Souvik Pal

At the end of the 2012 season, on New Year's Eve, Souvik Pal was escorted out of the club. He was subsequently found dead in the adjacent canal later that month. The unexplained death was later reclassified as a murder investigation after reports of Souvik being seen leaving the area with an unknown individual after being thrown out of the club. Although the death did not occur on the premises of the club, local councilors questioned whether the security at the club was sufficient.

Nick Bonnie

On the very first night of the 2013 season, a group of friends from Gloucestershire attended the opening event at The Warehouse Project. During the course of the night, one of their party fell ill and had to be taken to hospital, where he later died due to an overdose of an illegal drug he had consumed at The Warehouse Project. Initially, it was believed that Nick had purchased the drug inside club from a dealer, largely due to testimony of his friends, and this led to police and media fears of a "bad" batch of ecstasy, possibly laced with PMA. However, in subsequent court proceedings, the friends admitted to having invented this story to cover that they had brought the drug into the club themselves. The fall out from the death led to further calls for the club's license to be reviewed, and in the following days further hospital statements contributed to media reporting that the club itself had become an unacceptable risk.

The club responded to this by increasing in the number of medical and security staff at the venue. Various national politicians, including the Prime Minister David Cameron, commented on the incident and the dangers posed by people taking illegal drugs at clubs such as The Warehouse Project, calling it a tragic death.

References

External links
 The Warehouse Project official website
 The Warehouse Project Official Ticket Outlet 2017

Music venues in Manchester
Music venues in Greater Manchester
Club nights
Electronic dance music venues